Alison McGovern (born 30 December 1980) is a British politician who has served as Shadow Minister for Employment since 2021. A member of the Labour Party, she has been Member of Parliament (MP) for Wirral South since 2010.

Early life
The granddaughter of songwriter and activist Peter McGovern, she was born in Clatterbridge, Merseyside, the daughter of a British Railways telecoms engineer father and a mother who was a nurse.

She was educated at Brookhurst Primary School, and then Wirral Grammar School for Girls, where she was the Head Girl from 1998 to 1999. She then studied Philosophy at University College London.

On graduation, she worked as a researcher at the House of Commons, before handling communications for development projects at Network Rail, then working for the Art Fund and Creativity, Culture and Education.

Political life
McGovern was first elected as a councillor for Brunswick Park in the London Borough of Southwark in 2006, later becoming the Deputy Leader of the borough council's 29-member group of Labour councillors.

Parliamentary career
McGovern was selected as the Labour Party candidate for Wirral South in December 2009, following Ben Chapman's decision to stand down at the next election for family reasons following adverse publicity in The Daily Telegraph over the expenses scandal, and subsequently won the seat in the 2010 general election, defeating the Conservative candidate, Jeff Clarke, by 531 votes.

McGovern made her maiden speech in the House of Commons on 3 June 2010 in a debate on European Affairs. She became former Prime Minister Gordon Brown's parliamentary private secretary in July 2010. On 14 September 2010, she held her first adjournment debate regarding employment prospects for young people in Wirral. In November 2010. She was selected by the PLP to become a member of the International Development Select Committee.

In December 2010, she introduced a Private member's bill before Parliament that would amend the Public Libraries and Museums Act 1964 to broaden the scope of the general duty of library authorities so as to include a duty to provide related cultural facilities alongside the library service. In March 2011, she visited India as part of an International Development Select Committee delegation.

In the 2013 Labour reshuffle, she was added to the Shadow International Development team. In 2014, she was moved to the shadow Children and Families portfolio.

In May 2015, McGovern was appointed as shadow city minister in Labour's treasury team, but did not stay on the opposition frontbench after Jeremy Corbyn was elected Labour leader in September 2015. In October 2015, McGovern was appointed as Chair of Progress, a political organisation associated with the development of New Labour.

In January 2016, McGovern resigned from Labour's policy review on child poverty and combating inequality, as a protest against Progress being described by shadow Chancellor John McDonnell as having "a hard right agenda". She commented that she had been "backed into a corner". A Labour Party spokesperson stated "She is resigning from something that doesn't exist", as the initiative had not been confirmed or launched yet.

She supported Owen Smith in the failed attempt to replace Jeremy Corbyn in the 2016 Labour Party (UK) leadership election.

In September 2016 McGovern was elected co-chair of the all-party parliamentary group Friends of Syria.

Personal life
In 2008 McGovern married economist Ashwin Kumar, formerly a senior civil servant in the Department for Work and Pensions and Passenger Director at Passenger Focus. The couple have a daughter, born in 2011.

Notes

References

External links
 Alison McGovern MP official site

 

1980 births
Living people
Alumni of University College London
Councillors in the London Borough of Southwark
English people of Irish descent
Female members of the Parliament of the United Kingdom for English constituencies
Labour Party (UK) MPs for English constituencies
People educated at Wirral Grammar School for Girls
UK MPs 2010–2015
UK MPs 2015–2017
UK MPs 2017–2019
UK MPs 2019–present
21st-century British women politicians
Members of the Fabian Society
21st-century English women
21st-century English people
Women councillors in England